Miriam Bjørnsrud (born 9 October 1992) is a Norwegian former racing cyclist. She finished 38th in the 2013 UCI women's road race in Florence. In 2015, she won the Norwegian National Road Race Championships.

She stated an inability to complete shake off anxiety racing in the peloton after she was injured in a high speed crash at the 2014 Road World Championships road race.

Major results

2010
 National Junior Road Championships
1st  Road race
2nd Time trial
2012
 National Road Championships
2nd Road race
2nd Criterium
2013
 2nd Road race, National Road Championships
 7th Road race, UEC European Under-23 Road Championships
2014
 1st  Criterium, National Road Championships
2015
 1st  Road race, National Road Championships
 3rd Cholet Pays de Loire Dames
 4th Erondegemse Pijl
2016
 National Road Championships
2nd Road race
3rd Time trial
2017
 3rd Overall Tour of Thailand
1st  Mountains classification

References

External links

1992 births
Living people
Norwegian female cyclists
Cyclists at the 2015 European Games
European Games competitors for Norway